Kimberly Kaye Wyatt (born February 4, 1982) is an American singer, dancer, choreographer, actress, and television personality. She is a former member of the pop/R&B girl group and dance ensemble The Pussycat Dolls. She is also a member of the dance duo Her Majesty & the Wolves, alongside Spencer Nezey.

From 2009 to 2014, Wyatt was a judge on the Sky1 dance competition show Got to Dance. She won BBC One's Celebrity MasterChef in 2015, and the following year, she became the ambassador for the Bloch Dance World Cup. Since 2019, she has starred in the CBBC series Almost Never, and in 2022, Wyatt competed in the fourteenth series of Dancing on Ice with professional partner Mark Hanretty.

Life and career

Childhood and early years
Wyatt was born in Warrensburg, Missouri, a town near Kansas City, Missouri, and is of English, Scottish, German, and Swiss-German descent. She began dancing at the age of seven. At the age of 14, she earned a scholarship to study in New York's Joffrey Ballet and the Broadway Dance Center. At the age of seventeen, she graduated from high school and flew to Las Vegas to audition for cruise ship and casino shows. She worked in a revue on Royal Caribbean's Explorer of the Seas for two years.

2001–2010: Career beginnings and the Pussycat Dolls

In 2001, Wyatt moved to Los Angeles despite getting an offer from Hubbard St. Dance Co. In 2002, Wyatt became one of the dancers on the comedy sketch show, Cedric the Entertainer Presents as a Cedsation. In 2003, she was a dancer in Nick Lachey's music video for the single "Shut Up." Robin Antin was the choreographer, and it was here that she asked Wyatt to join the Pussycat Dolls. Wyatt does the standing oversplit in most of Pussycat Dolls music video, which she called her trademark move.

Wyatt's first vocal role in the Pussycat Dolls came when she recorded a cover of Jane Child's hit song "Don't Wanna Fall in Love" for the Deluxe Edition of their second album, Doll Domination. After Jessica Sutta, Wyatt was the second member to announce her departure from the group. She confirmed her departure in Loaded Magazine. She said the Dolls gave her more than she could ever have before and gave her a great platform to help her in the industry. Since leaving, Wyatt has gone on to pursue a range of projects, including as a judge on the British reality show Got To Dance.

2010–2018: Got to Dance, Her Majesty & the Wolves and solo music career
Wyatt became one of three judges of Sky1's dance show, Got to Dance, alongside Ashley Banjo and Adam Garcia, in 2010. In September 2010, it was announced that Got to Dance would return for a second season. That year, she was also featured on Aggro Santos' track "Candy". "Candy" was the lead track for the film StreetDance 3D. The song peaked at number five on the UK Singles Chart, becoming Wyatt's ninth top ten hit in the United Kingdom, including eight (with two number ones) as part of the Pussycat Dolls. In October 2010, it was announced that Wyatt along with Paula Abdul and Travis Payne would be judges on Live to Dance, the US version of Got to Dance. The show aired for one season on CBS and was not renewed. Taio Cruz performed "Higher" on ITV's Daybreak on and BBC One's Let's Dance for Comic Relief with Wyatt filling in for Kylie Minogue.

In 2009, Wyatt told Digital Spy that she was recording her first solo album and confirmed that she has already worked with rappers Paul Wall and Baby Bash and producers from "The Cold Chamber" like Mickaël on the record. She said the album would be released within a year. Wyatt performed her brand new single "Derriere" for the first time on an episode of Got to Dance on February 24, 2013. As of July 2015, no album has been released.

In 2010, Wyatt teamed up with former Jupiter Rising member Spencer Nezey, forming the group Her Majesty & the Wolves. Their album 111 was released in the UK on July 11, 2011.

On March 7, 2013, Wyatt appeared on BBC Radio 1's Innuendo Bingo.

In October 2014, Wyatt launched her perfume 'Kaydance'.

In March 2015, it was announced that Wyatt would take part in ITV's Give a Pet a Home show which works alongside the RSPCA in Birmingham. In July 2015, she won the final of Celebrity MasterChef on BBC One, beating Sam Nixon, Rylan Clark and Scott Maslen.

In November 2015, Wyatt became a School Sport Ambassador in the UK for the Youth Sport Trust, promoting health and well-being for young women through dance.

2019–present: The Pussycat Dolls reunion 
In 2019, Wyatt began starring in the CBBC series Almost Never. On November 29, 2019, after months of speculation for a possible Pussycat Dolls reunion, Wyatt along with Bachar, Roberts, Scherzinger, and Sutta confirmed their reunion on Heart radio where they also announced a tour originally scheduled for 2020. A live performance on the finale of The X Factor: Celebrity followed, which included a medley of previous singles and their new song, "React". British media regulator Ofcom received over 400 complaints from viewers who criticized the band's perceived provocative nature of their performance. "React" was released in February 2020 to moderate success.

In October 2021, she was announced as a contestant on the fourteenth series of Dancing on Ice.

Personal life 

In 2011, she began a relationship with model Max Rogers and they became engaged in September 2013. The couple married in a private ceremony in February 2014. They have three children together, two daughters and a younger son. Wyatt revealed in October 2019 that she was sterilized after giving birth to her third child. Since 2010, she has established herself in the United Kingdom, and resides with Rogers in Surrey.

Discography

Featured singles

Promotional singles

Album appearances 

Notes

Music videos

Filmography

Awards and nominations

References

External links

1982 births
Living people
21st-century American singers
21st-century American women singers
American choreographers
American contemporary R&B singers
American dance musicians
American expatriates in the United Kingdom
American female dancers
American people of English descent
American people of Scottish descent
American people of Swiss-German descent
American women choreographers
American women pop singers
Dance teachers
Dancers from Missouri
Participants in American reality television series
People from Warrensburg, Missouri
Reality cooking competition winners
Singers from Missouri
The Pussycat Dolls members